Lizard King may refer to:

People
 Jim Morrison (1943–1971), an American musician, singer for the Doors
 The Lizard King, a play about Jim Morrison, starring Stephen Nichols
 Lizardking, stage name of Gustaf Grefberg, a Swedish musician
Wong Keng Liang, a Malaysian wildlife trafficker 
Miles Mikolas, baseball pitcher for the St. Louis Cardinals
 Robert California, a fictional character on the U.S. comedy series The Office

Other uses
 "The Lizard King" (Spider-Man), an episode of the TV series Spider-Man
 Lizard King Records, a New York and London-based label
 Jacksonville Lizard Kings, a defunct minor league ice hockey team in Jacksonville, Florida, U.S.
 The Lizard King (film), a 1988 Australian television film
 Lizard king (Dungeons & Dragons), a variant of the fictional Lizardfolk

See also 
 Island of the Lizard King, a 1984 single-player adventure gamebook
 King Lizard, an English rock band
 Moko, the king of lizards in the mythology of Mangaia in the Cook Islands
 Tomb of the Lizard King, a 1982 Dungeons & Dragons adventure module